Tyler Harrell is an American football wide receiver for the Alabama Crimson Tide. He previously played for the Louisville Cardinals.

High school career
Harrell attended Christopher Columbus High School in Westchester, Florida. He committed to the University of Louisville to play college football.

College career

Louisville 
Harrell played at Louisville from 2018 to 2021. During his first three years he had two receptions for 36 yards. In 2021, he had 18 receptions for 523 yards with six touchdowns.

Alabama 
After the 2021 season, Harrell transferred to the University of Alabama.

References

External links
Alabama Crimson Tide bio

Living people
Year of birth missing (living people)
Players of American football from Florida
American football wide receivers
Alabama Crimson Tide football players
Louisville Cardinals football players